The Asian Wushu Championships is a continental wushu championship hosted by the Wushu Federation of Asia (WFA), the official continental representative to the International Wushu Federation. The competition is open to the 37 member nations of the WFA and their respective national teams. Unlike other continental wushu competitions which are held every two years, the Asian Wushu Championships is held every four years to make way for wushu at the Asian Games. 

The WFA also hosts the Asian Junior Wushu Championships, Asian Kungfu Championships, and the Asian Sanda Cup.

History 
In 1985, the preparatory committee for the creation of the IWUF was created at the 1st International Invitational Wushu Championship. In 1987, a preparatory committee was created for the formation of the Wushu Federation of Asia, which was largely guided by the Chinese Wushu Association. Later that year, ten, and later twelve nations applied for participation in the first Asian Wushu Championships in Yokohama, Japan. Over 90 competitors competed in the 16 events of the first championships.

Championships

Asian Wushu Championships

Asian Junior Wushu Championships

Asian Kungfu Championships

Asian Sanda Cup

See also 
 World Junior Wushu Championships
 List of international wushu competitions
 World Wushu Championships
 Wushu at the Asian Games

References

Further reading 

 Wushu competitions in Asia, Shen Liang,

External links 

 Official website of the Wushu Federation of Asia
 Official website of the International Wushu Federation

Recurring sporting events established in 1987
Wushu competitions
Wushu_Championships